Ahmad Saidi bin Mohamad Daud is a Malaysian politician. He was formely the Member of Perak State Legislative Assembly for Changkat Jering and served as a Perak State Executive Councillor.

Election Results

References

Living people
People from Perak
Malaysian people of Malay descent
Malaysian Muslims
United Malays National Organisation politicians
Members of the Perak State Legislative Assembly
Perak state executive councillors
21st-century Malaysian politicians
Year of birth missing (living people)